Road 19 is a road in western Iran. It connects Eslamabad-e Gharb to Poldokhtar and to Tehran-Ahvaz Road.

See also
Road 17 (Iran)

References

External links 

 Iran road map on Young Journalists Club

Roads in Iran